Valby Idrætspark is a multi-purpose stadium in Valby od Copenhagen, Denmark.  It is currently used mostly for football matches and is the home ground of Boldklubben Frem. Valby Idrætspark has hosted a total of nine Danish FA-recognized internationals.

History
Valby Idrætspark is located on the former Valby Common. It was first used for football in 1913. The lack of proper facilities for the football clubs were subject to discussions between Valby Boldspil  and the City but plans to build a large club house went on hold with the outbreak of World War I. In 1922, the plans were revived but once again without result due to disagreements over the financing. In 1926, a total of 10 football clubs used Valby Fælled but by then the conditions had become so poor that most of them had to find other premises, mostly on Øster Fælled (The Rast Common) in Østerbro.

In the 1930s, plans arose to built an extensive sports complex on Valby Fælled as part of a possible Danish bid for hosting the Olympic Games. The plans involved a football stadium, 18 football pitches for training, a club house for Boldklubben Frem and another one for the other clubs, an aquatic stadium, tennis courts, four halls for gymnastics, boxing, wrestling and weight lifting, 20 shooting ranges, bowling court, restaurant, offices, changing facilities and an indoor arena. Work began in 1937 but the plans were affected by the outbreak of World War II and the German Occupation of Denmark. BK Frem moved from Enghave vej to their new club house on 7 March 1942. The name of the area was officialled changed from Valby Fælled to Valby Idrætspark on 18 August 1942. The opening game was played between BK Frem and a selected team with seven players from BK Fremad Valby, three players from Valby and one from Als. Valby Idrætspark hosted 449 football matches in 1949 and 507 in 1950.

In 1964, Valby Idrætspark was used by a total of 126 sports clubs of which 45 were football clubs. The new Banbury tribune, with inspiration from Coventry, was inaugurated on 7 September 1969 with a match between BK Frem and Esbjerg.

In 2007, Copenhagen Municipality predicted that the main stand would last another 5–10 years. As of April 2007 major investments are put on hold as a decision on the construction of a new stadium is being awaited.

On Januar 2016 the municipality ordered a renovation of the existing stadium, worth 3 mio €. Thus cancelling plans for a New Stadium in the near future.  The Renovation is due ultimo 2017.

See also
New Valby Idrætspark

References

External links
 National team matches hosted by Valby Idrætspark at Danish Football Association

Buildings and structures in Valby
Sport in Valby
Football venues in Denmark
Boldklubben Frem
Multi-purpose stadiums in Denmark